Wenna (c. 474 - 544) was a 6th-century queen and saint of Cornwall and Wales. She founded St Wenna's Church in Morval, Cornwall. The fest in Catholic Church: October, 18.

Family
Wenna was known in Wales as Gwen ferch Cynyr, and was the daughter of Cynyr Ceinfarfog of Caer Goch, Pembrokeshire.

She married Salomon of Cornwall and became the mother of Cybi.

She was also sister of Sir Kay of the Arthurian legend, and Non of Brittany, and thus the aunt of David, patron saint of Wales.

She should also not be confused with her aunt, also called Wenna, and who also founded churches in Cornwall.

Some interpretation of the early Welsh versions of the Arthurian legend would have her growing up with King Arthur.

References

People from Pembrokeshire
6th-century Christian saints
Medieval Cornish saints
Year of birth unknown
Year of death unknown
Christian royal saints
Female saints of medieval England
6th-century English people
6th-century English women
Year of birth uncertain